Parré Chocolat is a premium chocolate company operating out of United States. Parré Chocolate was founded in 2017 by Gary Parr, who was referred to as the Willy Wonka of Wall Street by Bloomberg News and Katherine Parr, his wife.  The company's manufacturing facility is located in Fair Lawn, New Jersey. Parré uses ethically grown fair trade cocoa for its products.

See also
 List of bean-to-bar chocolate manufacturers
 List of chocolate bar brands

References

External links 
 

American chocolate companies
Brand name chocolate
Companies based in Bergen County, New Jersey
Food and drink companies established in 2017
Fair Lawn, New Jersey